TFM-4AS-1 is a dual selective androgen receptor modulator (SARM) and 5α-reductase inhibitor. It is a potent and selective partial agonist (Emax = 55%) of the androgen receptor (IC50 = 30 nM) and inhibitor of 5α-reductase types I and II (IC50 = 2 and 3 nM, respectively). TFM-4AS-1 shows tissue-selective androgenic effects; it promotes the accumulation of bone and muscle mass and has reduced effects in reproductive tissues and sebaceous glands. In addition, it does not promote growth of the prostate gland and it antagonizes the actions of dihydrotestosterone (DHT) in the seminal vesicles. Structurally, TFM-4AS-1 is a 4-azasteroid.

See also
 Cl-4AS-1
 MK-0773
 YK-11

References

External links

TFM-4AS-1 - Sigma-Aldrich
SARMs Vs Prohormones
All About Sarms
SARMS and Liquid Research Chems

5α-Reductase inhibitors
Androstanes
Carboxamides
Trifluoromethyl compounds
Ketones
Selective androgen receptor modulators